Necati Özçağlayan (born 15 May 1953) is Turkish retired professional football player who played as a defender. A one club man for Trabzonspor, Necati was part of the club from 1972-1986 and won all 6 of Trabzonspor's Süper Lig titles during his playing career.

International career
Necati was an international for the Turkey national football team, making his debut in a 2-2 friendly match with Romania on 12 October 1975.

References

External links
 
  (as player)
  (as coach)
 

Living people
1953 births
Sportspeople from Trabzon
Turkish footballers
Turkey international footballers
Turkey youth international footballers
Süper Lig players
Trabzonspor footballers
Adana Demirspor managers
Association football defenders
Turkish football managers